Mycobacterium pulveris is a species of Mycobacterium.

References

External links
Type strain of Mycobacterium pulveris at BacDive -  the Bacterial Diversity Metadatabase

Acid-fast bacilli
pulveris